Bembidion assimile is a species of ground beetle native to Europe.

References

assimile
Beetles described in 1810
Beetles of Europe